The Regency Route is a name given since 1977 to a regular bus service between Brighton in East Sussex and Tunbridge Wells in Kent, both towns with a Regency heritage. The route runs via the East Sussex towns of Lewes, Uckfield and Crowborough.

The Brighton to Tunbridge Wells route is one of few successful examples of bustitution, as it replaced through trains from Brighton via Lewes and Uckfield to Tunbridge Wells withdrawn in the 1960s when the railway lines from Lewes to Uckfield and Eridge to Tunbridge Wells were closed by British Railways. The bus route now provides access to the Lavender Line and the Spa Valley Railway preserved railways which run on lengths of those two railways. The journey from end to end is timed at between 1¾ and 2 hours.

Originally operated jointly by Southdown Brighton & Hove (now Brighton & Hove), Southdown East Sussex (now Stagecoach in East Sussex), and Maidstone & District Motor Services (now Arriva Southern Counties), the service is now operated solely by Brighton & Hove. Since April 2011, Brighton & Hove has used the Regency Route branding for the route 28 service from Brighton to Lewes and Ringmer as well as the 29.

History
1977: The route number 729 and Regency Route name were introduced by Southdown Motor Services operating between Brighton and Tunbridge Wells, a joint operation with Maidstone & District Motor Services. Service 28 was a shortened variant of the 128/728 route to Eastbourne, running as far as Ringmer.
1 January 1986: Formation of Brighton & Hove Bus and Coach Company from the Brighton operations of Southdown Motor Services. The route remained a joint operation with Southdown (from its Lewes depot) and Maidstone & District.
1998 - Maidstone & District Motor Services was acquired by Arriva to form Arriva Kent & East Sussex
26 September 2004 - 729 re-numbered to 29.
25 September 2005 - Stagecoach and Arriva withdraw from joint service, route entirely Brighton & Hove.
9 April 2009 - A night bus service running three days a week, the N29, was introduced over the route between Brighton and Uckfield.
17 April 2011 - 28 and 29 both branded as Regency routes; combined 10-minute frequency between Brighton and Lewes.
2019 - Some of the buses used were painted in a purple and gold livery and given purple upholstery.  
2022 - Some of the purple buses were decorated for the Queen's Platinum Jubilee and later some were given icons of Brighton (i360 tower), Lewes (castle) or Tunbridge Wells (Spa Valley Railway locomotive).

References

External links
Route 28  Brighton & Hove
Route 29  Brighton & Hove
Route 29B  Brighton & Hove

28
Transport in Brighton and Hove
Transport in East Sussex